Märta Margaretha af Ugglas (née Stenbeck; born 5 January 1939) is a Swedish former Moderate Party politician. She was Minister for Foreign Affairs between 1991 and 1994.

Career
She is the daughter of Hugo Stenbeck, a lawyer and the founder of Investment AB Kinnevik, and his wife Märta (née Odelfeldt). She was the sister of Hugo Jr (1933–1976), Elisabeth Silfverstolpe (1935–1985) and Jan Stenbeck (1942–2002). af Ugglas fought a bitter feud with her brother Jan over the family fortune, and subsequently withdrew from her brother and Kinnevik.

af Ugglas attended the Harvard-Radcliffe Program in Business Administration from 1960 to 1971 and graduated from the Stockholm School of Economics in 1964 with a degree in business administration and economics (Civilekonom). She then worked for Veckans Affärer from 1967 to 1968 and Svenska Dagbladet from 1968 to 1973 as an editorial writer. She was a member of the Stockholm County Council from 1971 to 1973, was publisher of the Svensk tidskrift from 1980 to 1991, and sat in the Swedish Riksdag between 1974 and 1995.

After the election victory in September 1991, Margaretha af Ugglas became Sweden's second female Minister for Foreign Affairs. Her term included the finalisation of the negotiations leading up to Sweden's entry into the European Union. In 1992, together with an EU Commissioner and nine other Ministers of Foreign Affairs from the Baltic Sea area, she founded the Council of the Baltic Sea States (CBSS) and the EuroFaculty. af Ugglas served as the Chairperson-in-Office of the OSCE from 1992 to 1993. The Moderate Party lost the 1994 election and she was elected to the European Parliament in 1995. She was vice chairman of the European People's Party from 1996.

She was a member of the Committee on Foreign Affairs, a board member of the Swedish International Development Cooperation Agency (SIDA) and a delegate of the Council of Europe. Furthermore, af Ugglas was board member of the Bulten-Kanthal AB, Investment AB Kinnevik Boliden AB, Swedish Match AB and Stora Kopparbergs Bergslags AB. She was chairman of the Save the Children's Stockholm Association, the Swedish Women's Voluntary Defence Organization and the Jarl Hjalmarson Foundation from 2002 to 2010.

Personal life
In 1966 she married Bertil af Ugglas (1934–1977), the son of Commander Oscar af Ugglas and Ingeborg (née Lewenhaupt).

Awards and decorations
  1st Class of the Order of the Cross of Terra Mariana (9 February 2000)

References

1939 births
Living people
Female foreign ministers
Swedish Ministers for Foreign Affairs
Members of the Riksdag from the Moderate Party
Stockholm School of Economics alumni
Harvard Business School alumni
Women members of the Riksdag
Stenbeck family
Moderate Party MEPs
MEPs for Sweden 1995–1999
20th-century women MEPs for Sweden
Recipients of the Order of the Cross of Terra Mariana, 1st Class
Women government ministers of Sweden
Members of the Riksdag 1974–1976
Members of the Riksdag 1976–1979
Members of the Riksdag 1979–1982
Members of the Riksdag 1982–1985
Members of the Riksdag 1985–1988
Members of the Riksdag 1988–1991
Members of the Riksdag 1991–1994
Members of the Riksdag 1994–1998
Members of the Riksdag 1998–2002
21st-century Swedish women politicians
Swedish women diplomats
Swedish baronesses